Analysis is a peer-reviewed academic journal of philosophy established in 1933 that is published quarterly by Oxford University Press on behalf of the Analysis Trust. Prior to January 2009, the journal was published by Blackwell Publishing. Electronic access to this journal is available via JSTOR (1933–2013), Wiley InterScience (1996–2008), and Oxford Journals (2009–present). The journal publishes short, concise articles (of up to 4000 words, excluding bibliography) in virtually any field of the analytic tradition.

Editors 
 1933–1948 Austin Duncan-Jones
 1948–1956 Margaret MacDonald
 1956–1965 Bernard Mayo
 1965–1971 Peter Winch
 1971–1976 C. J. F. Williams
 1976–1987 Christopher Kirwan
 1987–1999 Peter Smith
 2000–2016 Michael Clark
 2016–2017 Chris Daly and David Liggins
 2017-2021 David Liggins
 2021-     Stacie Friend, David Liggins and Lee Walters

Notable articles 
A number of seminal works have been published in the journal. Some of the most recognizable are:

 Toulmin, Stephen. (1948). "The Logical Status of Psycho-Analysis". 9 (2), pp. 23–29.
 Church, Alonzo. (1950). "On Carnap's Analysis of Statements of Assertion and Belief". 10 (5), pp. 97–99.
 Anderson, Alan Ross. (1951). "A Note on Subjunctive and Counterfactual Conditionals". 12 (2), pp. 35–38.
 Nuel Belnap. (1962) "Tonk, Plonk and Plink". 22 (6) pp. 130–134.
 Gettier, Edmund. (1963). "Is Justified True Belief Knowledge?". 23 (6), pp. 121–123.
 Lewis, David. (1988). "Vague Identity: Evans Misunderstood". 48 (3), pp. 128–130.
 McKinsey, Michael. (1991). "Anti-Individualism and Privileged Access". 51 (1), pp. 9–16.
 Brueckner, Anthony. (1992). "What an Anti-Individualist Knows A Priori". 52 (2), pp. 111–118.
 Clark, Andy and Chalmers, David. (1998). "The Extended Mind". 58 (1), pp. 7–19.
 Elga, Adam. (2000). "Self-locating Belief and the Sleeping Beauty problem". 60 (266), pp. 143–147.
 Knobe, Joshua. (2003). "Intentional Action and Side Effects in Ordinary Language". 63 (279), pp. 190–194.

See also 
List of philosophy journals

References

External links 
 
 

Oxford University Press academic journals
Logic journals
Publications established in 1933
English-language journals
Quarterly journals
Analytic philosophy literature